William John Hartley (born 27 June 1950) is an English former athlete.

Athletics career
Hartley was raised in Lydiate, Lancashire (now Merseyside) on the outskirts of Liverpool where his family ran a market garden.  He began his athletic career at age 13 as a high jumper. By age 18 he held the Under-19 record for 400m hurdles (52.9 seconds). Following success in national and international competition, Hartley won a silver medal representing England at the 1974 British Commonwealth Games in Christchurch, New Zealand and then a gold medal at the European Championships in Rome in the 400m relay. He also represented England in the 400 metres hurdles event, at the 1978 Commonwealth Games in Edmonton, Alberta, Canada.

He was a member of the winning Europa Cup 4 × 400 m relay team, along with Alan Pascoe, David Jenkins and Jim Aukett. An achilles tendon problem ended his running career in 1982, after which he became a sprint coach and conditioner for Widnes Rugby League Club and then Wigan Rugby League Club.

Personal life
In 1977 Hartley married fellow athlete Donna Hartley. The marriage later ended in divorce. Hartley now runs the family floriculture business in Lydiate.

His son Tom Hartley (cricketer) plays for Lancashire County Cricket Club.

References

 Nursery
 gbrathletics

External links
 
 

1950 births
Living people
People from Lydiate
British male sprinters
English male sprinters
English athletics coaches
Commonwealth Games medallists in athletics
Athletes (track and field) at the 1974 British Commonwealth Games
European Athletics Championships medalists
Commonwealth Games silver medallists for England
Sportspeople from Liverpool
Medallists at the 1974 British Commonwealth Games